Kipkurui Misoi (born 23 October 1978 in Bomet) is a retired Kenyan long-distance runner who specialized in the 3000 metres steeplechase.

Achievements

Personal bests
1500 metres - 3:39.17 min (1998)
3000 metres - 7:40.93 min (2000)
5000 metres - 13:26.83 min (1998)
3000 metre steeplechase - 8:01.69 min (2001)

External links

1978 births
Living people
Kenyan male middle-distance runners
Kenyan male long-distance runners
Kenyan male steeplechase runners
Athletes (track and field) at the 1998 Commonwealth Games
Commonwealth Games medallists in athletics
Commonwealth Games bronze medallists for Kenya
African Games gold medalists for Kenya
African Games medalists in athletics (track and field)
Kenyan male cross country runners
Athletes (track and field) at the 1999 All-Africa Games
20th-century Kenyan people
Medallists at the 1998 Commonwealth Games